Tricks, Treats And Other Tales From The Crypt is a compilation album released by Detroit-based Heavy Metal band Halloween (metal band) in 2003. It features re-recorded versions of classic Halloween songs, as well as one new studio track. It was recorded in 2002-2003.

Halloween's breakout album was recorded in 2002 with what has come to be known as the Halloween 4.0 lineup. The 4th iteration of the band featured founding vocalist Brian Thomas, Axe Slayer Donny Allen, Jason "JDawg" Rossvanes on drums, Tommy Vendetta Guitar and John "Sixpac" Guarascio on Bass. The lineup was actually not originally intended to be Halloween, but unbelievable fan support for Halloween almost forced their hand. The band worked tirelessly to record a mix of classic Halloween "hits" and a handful of new/unrecorded tracks. The band played several shows stateside before being signed to headline the Keep It True Festival in Germany. It was during this era that the band finally made a run for Europe. The band had amassed a large cult following in Europe, but never had a lineup or management to get the ball rolling. The great success and European media blitz that followed the release of Trick, Treats, and Other Tales From The Crypt is what propelled Halloween into the spotlight it still enjoys today. Though short lived, "Halloween 4.0" is undoubtedly the incarnation that got Halloween out of Detroit.

Track listing 

 Welcome (originally on Victims of the Night)
 Tales From The Crypt (originally on Don't Metal With Evil)
 7 Years (originally on No One Gets Out)
 Fighting Words (later re-recorded on Horror Fire album)
 Crawl To The Altar (originally on No One Gets Out)
 Black Skies (originally on Vicious Demos)
 She's A Teazer (originally on Don't Metal With Evil)
 Vicious Lies (originally on Vicious Demos)
 Trick Or Treat (originally on Don't Metal With Evil)
 Lights, Camera, Action (new track)
 What A Nice Place (originally on Don't Metal With Evil)
 No One Gets Out (originally on No One Gets Out)
 Die Forever (Live) (new track)
 Fire Still Burns (Live) (new track)

Personnel 

Brian Thomas - vocals
Donny Allen - guitar
Tommy Vendetta - guitar
John Guarascio - bass
Jason Rossvanes - drums

Guests

V Lee III - guitar

Sources
Official Halloween website

Halloween (band) albums
2003 albums